Mohamed Hamouda Hamouda Bensaï (1902 in Batna – 1998 in Algiers) was an Algerian philosopher and essayist. He studied philosophy at Sorbonne, and was one of the major Algerian thinkers from the 1930s onwards. He chaired the circle of the Association of Franco-North Africa, founded by Marcellin Piel.

References

Algerian philosophers
1902 births
1998 deaths
People from Batna, Algeria
Algerian essayists
University of Paris alumni
20th-century essayists
20th-century philosophers
Algerian expatriates in France